Céline Minard (born 1969 in Rouen) is a French writer.

Biography 
After studying philosophy, she devoted herself to the work of writing, sometimes collaborating with visual artists. Her work would mark "the return of pure and hard fiction in the French literary landscape".

In 2007 and 2008, she was a resident of the Villa Médicis in Rome. In 2011, she was a resident of Villa Kujoyama in Kyoto in Japan.

In 2008, her 4th novel, Bastard Battle, was rewarded with a special mention by the jury of the Prix Wepler.

In 2011, she received the prestigious Franz-Hessel-Preis for So Long Luise.

Works 
2004: R., Comp'Act.
2005: La Manadologie, Musica Falsa Éditions
2007: Le Dernier Monde, Denoël.
2008: Bastard battle, coll. « Laureli »
2010: Olimpia, Denoël
2011: So long, Luise, Denoël
2011: Les Ales, in collaboration with scomparo, Cambourakis
2013: Faillir être flingué, Payot & Rivages.
2014: KA TA, emballé by scomparo, Rivages
2016: Le Grand Jeu, Rivages

Distinctions 
 Special mention of the Prix Wepler 2008 for Bastard battle
 Franz-Hessel Prize 2011 for So long, Luise
 Prix Virilo 2013 for Faillir être flingué
 Prix du Style 2013 for Faillir être flingué
 Prix du Livre Inter 2014 for Faillir être flingué
 Sélection Prix Mauvais genres 2013 for Faillir être flingué.

References

External links 
 
 
 Céline Minard at Matthes & Seitz
 Céline Minard at Berlin International Literature Festival, 2014

21st-century French non-fiction writers
Prix du Livre Inter winners
Chevaliers of the Ordre des Arts et des Lettres
1969 births
Writers from Rouen
Living people
21st-century French women writers